Ralf Sträßer (born 20 June 1958) is a German former professional footballer who played as a striker.

Career
Born in Berlin, Sträßer began playing football for the BSG Post Berlin at eight years old and joined the youth department the BFC Dynamo two years later. He took the leap into the first team of BFC Dynamo, after making appearance for the second team in the DDR-Liga. He made his debut for the first team of BFC Dynamo  against FC Vorwärts Frankfurt in the 11th match day of the 1976–77 season on 2 December 1976. Sträßer scored his first goal for BFC Dynamo in the DDR-Oberliga on the East German national goalkeeper Jürgen Croy away against BSG Sachsenring Zwickau in the following matchday. 

Sträßer played in the East German top division for BFC Dynamo, 1. FC Union Berlin and FC Carl Zeiss Jena. In 226 matches he managed to score 68 goals. He became six times East German football champion in a row with BFC Dynamo. 

Sträßer, who was part of the East German Under 21 team which won the silver medal at the European Under-21 Championship 1980, won four caps for East Germany.

He is the father of Carsten Sträßer.

References

External links
 
 
 
 Ralf Sträßer – Union Berlin profile at immerunioner.de

1958 births
Living people
German footballers
East German footballers
East Germany international footballers
East Germany under-21 international footballers
Association football forwards
Berliner FC Dynamo players
1. FC Union Berlin players
FC Carl Zeiss Jena players
1. FC Schweinfurt 05 players
SpVgg Greuther Fürth players
German football managers
DDR-Oberliga players
Footballers from Berlin